is a Shinto shrine located in the Akebono-chō neighborhood of the city of Tsuruga, Fukui Prefecture, Japan. It is the ichinomiya of former Echizen Province. The main festival of the shrine is held annually on September 4.  The shrine is considered the chief guardian shrine of the Hokuriku region.

Enshrined kami
The kami enshrined at Kehi Jingū are:
, the semi-legendary Prince Tsunuga Arashito, who traveled from his home in Silla to Tsuruga during the reign of Emperor Sujin. According to the Nihon Shoki he had horns coming from his head; the area was named “Tsunuga,” written, literally, “horn-deer,” and over time it became “Tsuruga.”
, the semi-legendary 14th Emperor of Japan
, consort of Emperor Chūai

, the daughter of Empress Jingū
, the 15th Emperor of Japan
, legendary hero-statesman

History
The Kehi Jingū is located in the northeastern part of Tsuruga city in the central part of Fukui prefecture. Tsuruga has a good natural port, and was the gateway between the Kinai region and the Korean Peninsula and Asian continent since ancient times. Because of its location, the shine was given particular importance by the imperial court, and is mentioned frequently in ancient chronicles such as the "Kojiki" and "Nihon Shoki", especially in connection to events connected with the semi-legendary Emperor Chūai, Empress Jingū, and Emperor Ōjin and the Japanese conquest of the Three Kingdoms of Korea. The actual foundation of the shrine predates written history, and its first mention in national chronicles is from around 692 AD during the reign of Empress Jito. During the Heian period, imperial messengers were frequently dispatched to the shrine, and its ranking within the court hierarchy steadily rose, as described in the Shoku Nihon Kōki, Nihon Montoku Tennō Jitsuroku, Nihon Kiryaku and other historical sources. In the 927 Engishiki, it is listed as a myōjin taisha and by the end of the Heian period was the ichinomiya of the province. In the Heian and Kamakura period, the shrine commanded vast estates extending from Echizen to Echigo and Sado Province. The shrine sided with the Southern Court in the Nanboku-chō period, and even after defeat by the Northern Court, still commanded territory with a kokudaka of 240,000 koku. The shrine supported the Asakura clan during the Sengoku period and was thus largely destroyed by the forces of Oda Nobunaga. In the early Edo Period, the shrine's restored with a  very modest 100 koku by Yūki Hideyasu in 1604. It also received donation from Tokugawa Iemitsu and by the various daimyō of Ōno Domain, but never regained its former prosperity. In September of 1689, Kehi Jingu Shrine was visited by the famous poet Matsuo Basho, and his visit is still commemorated with a statue and a stone monument inscribed with his haiku.

During the Meiji period era of State Shinto, the shrine was rated as a under the Modern system of ranked Shinto Shrines

The shrine was mostly destroyed in 1945, during the Bombing of Tsuruga in World War II by American forces, and its National Treasure Honden built in the Edo period by Yūki Hideyasu burned down. One surviving structure is the shrine's 11-meter-tall torii gate, which was built in 1902 and which is registered as a National [Important Cultural Property. It is the third largest wooden torii gate in Japan, alongside Nara’s Kasuga Taisha Shrine and Hiroshima’s Itsukushima Shrine.

The shrine is located a 15-minute walk from Tsuruga Stationon the JR West Hokuriku Main Line.

Gallery

Cultural Properties

Important Cultural Properties
, Edo Period, 1645, wooden, painted vermillion. This torii gate has a height of 10.93 meters. The inscription is by Prince Arisugawa Takehito.

See also
List of Jingu
Ichinomiya

External links

 
Tsuruga Tourism Association

Notes

Kanpei-taisha
Shinto shrines in Fukui Prefecture
Jingū
Tsuruga, Fukui
Echizen Province
8th-century Shinto shrines
Ichinomiya
Beppyo shrines